Tramaine Thompson (born April 10, 1990) is an American football wide receiver and return specialist.  He played college football for the Kansas State Wildcats football team from 2010 to 2013.  As a junior in 2012, he returned 16 punts for 316 yards. He led all NCAA major college players that year with an average of 19.8 yards per punt return. During his four years at Kansas State, Thompson appeared in 43 games, totaling 109 receptions for 1,673 yards and 10 touchdowns.

See also
 List of NCAA major college yearly punt and kickoff return leaders

References

1990 births
Living people
American football return specialists
Kansas State Wildcats football players
Players of American football from Oklahoma
Sportspeople from Tulsa, Oklahoma